= Cherukottoor, Panamaram =

Cherukottoor Cherukottur
- village
- Country: India
- State: Kerala
- District: Wayanad

Population (2011)
  - Total: 11,462

Languages
  - Official: Malayalam, English
- Time zone: UTC+5:30 (IST)
- PIN: 6XXXXX
- ISO 3166 code: IN-KL
- Vehicle registration: KL-

Cherukottoor is a village in Wayanad district in the state of Kerala, India.

== Demographics ==
As of 2011 India census, Cherukottur had a population of 11462 with 5724 males and 5738 females.

== Transportation ==
Cheruvkottoor can be accessed by road from Mananthavady or Kalpetta. The Periya ghat road connects Mananthavady to Kannur and Thalassery. The Thamarassery mountain road connects Calicut with Kalpetta. The Kuttiady mountain road connects Vatakara with Kalpetta and Mananthavady. The Palchuram mountain road connects Kannur and Iritty with Mananthavady. The road from Nilambur to Ooty is also connected to Wayanad through the village of Meppadi.

The nearest railway station is at Mysore and the nearest airports are Kozhikode International Airport-120 km, Bengaluru International Airport-290 km, and Kannur International Airport, 58 km.
